Capell Lane Weems (July 7, 1860 – January 5, 1913) was an American lawyer and politician who served three terms as a U.S. Representative from Ohio from 1903 to 1909.

Biography 
Born in Whigville, Ohio, Weems attended the common schools and normal academy, Caldwell, Ohio. He studied law, was admitted to the bar in 1883 and commenced practice in Caldwell.

Weems was elected prosecuting attorney of Noble County in 1884. He served as member of the Ohio House of Representatives in 1888 and 1889. He moved to St. Clairsville, Ohio, in 1890 and served as prosecuting attorney of Belmont County 1890-1896.

Weems was elected as a Republican to the Fifty-eighth Congress to fill the vacancy caused by the resignation of Joseph J. Gill. He was reelected to the Fifty-ninth and Sixtieth Congresses and served from November 3, 1903, to March 3, 1909. He resumed the practice of law and was solicitor for the Pennsylvania Railroad.

He died in Steubenville, Ohio, January 5, 1913. He was interred in Union Cemetery, St. Clairsville, Ohio.

Weems married Mary B. Nay of West Virginia on November 6, 1883. They had  children named Chester N., Milton M., and Lillian A.

References

1860 births
1913 deaths
People from Noble County, Ohio
People from St. Clairsville, Ohio
Ohio lawyers
Republican Party members of the Ohio House of Representatives
County district attorneys in Ohio
19th-century American politicians
19th-century American lawyers
Republican Party members of the United States House of Representatives from Ohio